Conus bruuni is a species of sea snail, a marine gastropod mollusk in the family Conidae, the cone snails and their allies.

These snails are predatory and venomous. They are capable of "stinging" humans, therefore live ones should be handled carefully or not at all.

Description
The size of the shell varies between 33 mm and 61 mm.

Distribution
This marine species occurs off New Zealand (Kermadec Islands) and off New Caledonia.

References

 Tucker J.K. & Tenorio M.J. (2009) Systematic classification of Recent and fossil conoidean gastropods. Hackenheim: Conchbooks. 296 pp.
  Puillandre N., Duda T.F., Meyer C., Olivera B.M. & Bouchet P. (2015). One, four or 100 genera? A new classification of the cone snails. Journal of Molluscan Studies. 81: 1–23

External links
 The Conus Biodiversity website
 Cone Shells – Knights of the Sea
 
 Manuel J. Tenorio, Eric Monnier & Nicolas Puillandre - Notes on Afonsoconus Tucker & Tenorio, 2013 (Gastropoda, Conidae), with description of a new species from the Southwestern Indian Ocean; European Journal of Taxonomy 472: 1–20, 2018

bruuni
Gastropods of New Zealand
Gastropods described in 1958